Kim Joo-ri (born May 21, 1988) is a Korean model and beauty queen who was the winner of Miss Korea 2009, and actress. For the first time ever, the Miss Korea winner represented Korea in Miss World 2009, and competed in Miss Universe 2010. She was also crowned as Miss Seoul 2009 before competing in Miss Korea 2009.

Pageantry

Miss World 2009
Kim Joo-ri placed among the top 20 finalists of Miss World Beach Beauty competition which took place at Zimbali Resort, Kwazulu-Natal, Durban, South Africa on 25 November 2009 and won first runner up in the Miss World Talent competition. At Miss World 2009, she placed in the final Top 16, and won Beauty Queen of Asia & Oceania. Korea's last placement was Oh Eun-young in 2005. She later placed in the top 100 at Miss Grand Slam and finished in 56th place due to her semifinal position in Miss World. In 2010, she was guest judge in the final Mister World 2010 beauty pageant in Incheon, South Korea.

Miss Universe 2010
Kim Joo-ri represented South Korea in the Miss Universe 2010 pageant held on 23 August 2010, held in Las Vegas, Nevada, United States where she was unplaced.

Filmography

Television series

Films

See also
 Moscow State Academy of Choreography
 Royal Ballet School

References

External links

 Miss Korea 2009 profile
 Miss Universe 2010 profile
 

1988 births
Living people
Miss Universe 2010 contestants
Miss World 2009 delegates
People from Seoul
Miss Korea winners
South Korean film actresses
South Korean television actresses